The 1909 Colorado Agricultural Aggies football team represented Colorado Agricultural College (now known as Colorado State University) in the Colorado Faculty Athletic Conference (CFAC) during the 1909 college football season.  In their fourth and final season under head coach Claude Rothgeb, the Aggies compiled a 1–2 record (0–2 against CFAC opponents) and were outscored by a total of 91 to 38.

Schedule

References

Colorado Agricultural
Colorado State Rams football seasons
Colorado Agricultural Aggies football